China Gas Holdings Limited is a Chinese natural gas company principally engaged in the distribution of natural gas in 273 Chinese cities.

References

Natural gas companies of China